The Jean St-Germain Raz-Mut was an ultralight aircraft developed in Canada in the 1970s and marketed in kit form for homebuilding.

Design
It was a minimalist, open framework design consisting of a three-wheeled chassis supporting a pilot seat and pusher engine installation, to which a rigid wing of aluminium structure and skin was attached by struts. A conventional empennage of fabric-covered aluminium construction was carried on a long boom aft of the wing, and supported with a strut to the chassis.

Operational history
In August 2009 there were three Raz-Mut 440As on the Canadian Civil Register, all registered as amateur-builts, although at one time seven were registered.

Specifications

See also

References

 
 

1970s Canadian ultralight aircraft
Homebuilt aircraft
Aircraft first flown in 1976
High-wing aircraft
Single-engined pusher aircraft